Douglas Raymond Davis (born September 24, 1962) is an American former professional baseball player and current manager of the Scranton/Wilkes-Barre Railriders of the Triple-A International League. During his playing career, he appeared in seven games over two seasons as a catcher and third baseman for the California Angels and Texas Rangers of Major League Baseball (MLB).

Career
Davis attended North Carolina State University, where he played college baseball for the Wolfpack from 1982 to 1984.

He spent the 2007 and 2008 seasons as manager of the Toronto Blue Jays' Triple-A affiliate, the Syracuse Chiefs of the International League and was the bench coach of the Florida Marlins of MLB in 2003–04. He was the Blue Jays' Minor League Field Coordinator until 2016. He was the defensive coach for the New York Yankees AAA affiliate Scranton/Wilkes-Barre Railriders until 2020. On January 27, 2020, he was named Manager of the Railriders.

References

External links

1962 births
Living people
American expatriate baseball players in Canada
Baseball coaches from Pennsylvania
Baseball players from Pennsylvania
Binghamton Mets managers
California Angels players
Edmonton Trappers players
Florida Marlins coaches
Lake Elsinore Storm players
Major League Baseball bench coaches
Major League Baseball catchers
Major League Baseball infielders
Memphis Chicks players
Midland Angels players
Minor league baseball coaches
NC State Wolfpack baseball players
Oklahoma City 89ers players
Palm Springs Angels players
People from Bloomsburg, Pennsylvania
Peoria Chiefs players
Syracuse Chiefs managers
Texas Rangers players
Tulsa Drillers players